Daniel Webster Warner (October 1, 1857 – May 14, 1933) was a farmer, rancher and Canadian federal politician.

Warner first ran for a seat in the House of Commons of Canada in the 1917 Canadian federal election in the Battle River district. He ran in that election as a Laurier Liberal candidate and was defeated  in a close race by Unionist candidate William John Blair. Warner would run again in the 1921 Canadian federal election this time as a Progressive Party of Canada candidate. He would defeat incumbent Conservative James McCrie Douglas and another candidate in a landslide. Warner served 1 term in Federal Parliament before attempting re-election in the 1925 Canadian federal election His electoral district of Strathcona was abolished so he ran in the new Wetaskiwin district. He would be defeated by Liberal candidate and former provincial MLA Stanley Tobin.

External links
 

1857 births
1933 deaths
People from Keokuk County, Iowa
Members of the House of Commons of Canada from Alberta
Progressive Party of Canada MPs
Candidates in the 1917 Canadian federal election
Liberal Party of Canada candidates for the Canadian House of Commons
American emigrants to Canada